Darlaston railway station was a station built on the South Staffordshire Line in 1863. It served the town of Darlaston, and was located to the east of the town centre, on Walsall Road.  It was one of two railway stations that served the town.  The other, Darlaston James Bridge, was located on the Walsall to Wolverhampton Line and became known as Darlaston after the closure of this station.

Closure
The station closed in 1887, and there is little evidence of its existence at the site, although the former trackbed is in use as a footpath.

References

Disused railway stations in Walsall
Railway stations in Great Britain opened in 1863
Railway stations in Great Britain closed in 1887
Former London and North Western Railway stations